Sterkfontein (Afrikaans for Strong Spring) is a set of limestone caves of special interest in paleoanthropology located in Gauteng province, about  northwest of Johannesburg, South Africa in the Muldersdrift area close to the town of Krugersdorp. The archaeological sites of Swartkrans and Kromdraai are in the same area. Sterkfontein is a South African National Heritage Site and was also declared a World Heritage Site in 2000. The area in which it is situated is known as the Cradle of Humankind. The Sterkfontein Caves are also home to numerous wild African species including Belonogaster petiolata, a wasp species of which there is a large nesting presence.

Numerous early hominin remains have been found at the site over the last few decades. These have been attributed to Australopithecus, early Homo and Paranthropus.

History of investigations 

Modern excavation of the caves began in the late 1890s by limestone miners who noticed the fossils and brought them to the attention of scientists.

In 1936, students of Professor Raymond Dart and Dr. Robert Broom from the University of the Witwatersrand began concerted excavations. The caves yielded the first adult Australopithecine, substantially strengthening Dart's claim that the skull known as the Taung Child (an Australopithecus africanus) was a human ancestor. There was a pause in excavation during World War II, but after the war Dr. Robert Broom continued excavations. In 1947, he found a nearly complete skull of an adult female (STS 5) A. africanus (or possibly that of an adolescent male). Broom initially named the skull Plesianthropus transvaalensis (near-man from Transvaal), but it became better known by its nickname, Mrs. Ples. Mrs. Ples is now defined as a member of A. africanus.

In 1997, a nearly complete skeleton of a second species of Australopithecus (StW 573) was found in the caves by Ronald J. Clarke; extraction of the remains from the surrounding breccia is ongoing. The skeleton was named Little Foot, since the first parts found (in 1995, in storage) were the bones of a foot. Excavations continue to this day, and finds now total some 500 hominids, making Sterkfontein one of the richest sites in the world for early hominids. The Palaeo-Anthropology Scientific Trust (PAST), a non-profit trust fund established in 1993, sponsors over 90% of the research undertaken at Sterkfontein and was instrumental in its nomination as a World Heritage Site.

Dating of the deposits
The Member 4 deposits containing the Australopithecus africanus fossils have been dated to between 2.6 and 2.0 Ma, with the Sts5 "Mrs. Ples" fossil estimated to date to between 2.05–2.01 Ma based on a combination of Uranium–lead dating and palaeomagnetic analysis and electron spin resonance dating The StW 573 partial skeleton (Little Foot) was recovered from a separate infill at the site within the confines of the Silberberg Grotto. It is estimated to be around 2.6–2.2 Ma based on a combination of uranium-lead dating and palaeomagnetic analysis and belongs to a second species of australopith, Australopithecus prometheus. In contrast, surface exposure dating of sediments indicate that skeleton StW 573 has an age of approximately 4 million years. While the flowstone dated in the uranium-lead dating has been shown to have formed later than the fossil, an age estimate of ~3 Ma suggested by the same authors has little firm basis. The palaeomagnetic analysis  remains the most credible age estimate based on the current data as it included work on both sediments and speleothem.

A slightly younger deposit (StW 53 infill) dated to between  has revealed the remains of a specimen of early Homo (StW 53). StW 53 has been described as similar to Homo habilis or as a novel new species Homo gautengensis. No stone tools were associated with the fossil, but StW 53 has evidence for stone tool cut-marks. Member 5 contains Oldowan and Acheulian stone tools as well as specimens of early Homo and Paranthropus and is dated to between 1.6 and 1.1 Mya.

In 2022 cosmogenic nuclide dating found that the bulk of Member 4 is 3.4 million years old." The team responsible for this work, which includes Clarke, says: "These results place nearly the entire Australopithecus assemblage at Sterkfontein in the mid-Pliocene, contemporaneous with Australopithecus afarensis in East Africa." They say this discredits the assumption that A. africanus descended from A. afarensis.

Gallery

See also

Cradle of Humankind
List of caves in South Africa
Muldersdrift

References

Citations

Sources

External links

  Maropeng Visitors Centre  
Palaeo-Anthropology Scientific Trust

Archaeological sites in South Africa
Caves of South Africa
Landforms of Gauteng
Limestone caves
Mogale City Local Municipality
Paleoanthropological sites
Pleistocene paleontological sites of Africa
South African heritage sites
Tourist attractions in Gauteng
Archaeological sites of Southern Africa